State Road 344 (NM 344) is a  state highway in the US state of New Mexico. NM 344's southern terminus is at NM 333 and Historic US 66 in Edgewood, and the northern terminus is at NM 14 south-southwest of Golden.

Major intersections

See also

References

344
Transportation in Santa Fe County, New Mexico